Bangar in Iran may refer to:
 Bangar-e Olya
 Bangar-e Sofla